Angaria rugosa is a species of sea snail, a marine gastropod mollusk in the family Angariidae.

Description

The shell can grow to be 25 mm to 46 mm in length.

Distribution
Angaria rugosa can be found from East India to Vietnam and also off of the Philippines.

References

External links

Angariidae
Gastropods described in 1873